The Società Italiana per lo Studio della Storia Contemporanea (Italian Society for the study of contemporary history - SISSCO) is a non-profit organization founded in 1990 in order to promote the progress of contemporary history studies in Italy and their scientific, academic and civil importance. In Italy the expression "contemporary history" indicates the period between the end of the eighteenth century and today.

The society is composed exclusively by scholars specializing in Modern and Contemporary History. At the end of 2017 the association counted more than 700 paying members.

Activities 
SISSCO regularly organizes seminars and conferences in Italy. Of particular importance among the latters are the Cantieri di Storia Sissco (Sissco History Building Sites), that gathers every two years hundreds of historians, the Workshop Nazionale Dottorandi (National PhD workshop), a yearly meeting dedicated to Italian history PhDs and  Percorsi di Storia (Paths of History), a seminar on Italian historiography.

The society also awards two literary prizes: the Premio Sissco for the best contemporary history book of the previous year written by an Italian author; and the Premio ANCI-Storia, for books about local history, local identity and local government.

The society edits an online calendar that summarizes the contemporary history initiatives that take place in Italy as well as a calendar dedicated to call for papers,

Twice a year SISSCO publishes a journal, Il Mestiere di Storico, (The Historian's Craft), mostly dedicated to reviews of history books.

Organs

Directive Board 
SISSCO's Directive board is composed by the President and six members.  The president keeps his post for four years. Every year two new Directive board members are elected After the 2017 elections the Directive board members are Maurizio Ridolfi and Simona Merlo elected in 2015, Antonio Bonatesta and Daniela Saresella elected in 2016, Gabriella Gribaudi and Federico Mazzini elected in 2017.

Presidents

References 

Non-profit organisations based in Italy
Learned societies of Italy